is the Japanese word meaning . In the Japanese traditional martial arts such as karate, judo, aikido, Kūdō and kendo, it is a verbal command to "begin". Hajime is also a common Japanese given name for males.

In the Amami Islands, Hajime (元) is a surname.

Possible writings
Hajime can be written using different kanji characters and can mean:
始め, "beginning" or "start"
初め, "beginning" or "first"
as a given name
一, "first"
元, "beginning" or "origin"
始, "beginning" or "start"
肇, "beginning"
基, "fundamental"
創, "genesis"
孟, "beginning" or "chief"
朔, "first day of month"
甫, "beginning" or "great"
The name can also be written in hiragana as はじめ and katakana as ハジメ

People

Given name 
, Japanese politician
, Japanese musician, actor and comedian
, Japanese sumo wrestler
, Japanese politician
, Japanese football player
, first doctor to discover the Minamata disease
, Japanese voice actor
, Japanese manga artist; creator of manga Attack on Titan
, Japanese Vice-Admiral
, Japanese politician
, Japanese footballer and manager
, Japanese rower
, Japanese table tennis player
, Japanese novelist and manga story writer
, Japanese mecha (fictional walking robots) designer
, Japanese Marxist economist
, Japanese karateka
, Japanese activist, and a recycle shop owner
, Japanese golfer
, Japanese cellist and composer
, Japanese football player
, Japanese academic of Vedic, Hindu and Buddhist scriptures
, Japanese anime and film editor and director
, samurai who served in the Shinsengumi
, founder of Sammy Corporation
, Japanese photographer
, Japanese politician
, Japanese illustrator
, minister of war in the Imperial Japanese Army
, Japanese writer
, Japanese journalist
, Japanese politician
, Japanese philosopher
, Japanese professional fighting game player
, Japanese alpine skier
, Japanese manga artist
, Japanese animator and character designer
Watanabe Hajime (samurai), Japanese samurai of the Sengoku period
, Japanese sport shooter
, Japanese amateur Go player
, Japanese politician

Surname 
Chitose Hajime (元; born 1979), Japanese singer

Characters
Hajime Aikawa (始), a character from the Japanese live-action television series Kamen Rider Blade
Hajime Aoyagi (一), a character from the anime/manga series Yowamushi Pedal
Hajime Aoyama (ハジメ), a character from the anime series Ghost Stories
Hajime Kunihiro (一), a female character from the anime/manga series Saki
Hajime Saitō (一), a character from the anime/manga series Rurouni Kenshin
Hajime Hinata (創), the protagonist of the visual novel Danganronpa 2: Goodbye Despair
Hajime Ichinose (はじめ), the protagonist of Gatchaman Crowds
Hajime Yagi (はじめ), a character from the anime/manga series The World of Narue
Hajime Tanaka (田中 一), a character in the Osu! Tatakae!  Ouendan rhythm video game duology
Hajime Kindaichi (一), a character from the anime/manga series Kindaichi Case Files
Hajime Mutsuki (始), a character from the anime series Tsukiuta. The Animation and also a charismatic idol from Tsukino Production. Leader of the group "Six Gravity" consisting of six members including himself.
Hajime Tenga (一), one of the main characters from the anime series Kiznaiver
Hajime Iwaizumi (岩泉 一), a character from the anime series Haikyuu!! with the position of vice captain and wing spiker from Aoba Johsai High
Hajime Owari (ハジメ), a character from the anime series Dagashi Kashi
Hajime Tsukishima (基), a character from the anime/manga series Golden Kamuy
Hajime Katsura (はじめ), a character from the anime/manga series Digimon Universe: App Monsters
Hajime Makunouchi, a character from the Danganronpa fangame, Super Danganronpa Another 2.
Hajime Fukuroda, a character from Japanese live-action television  Great Teacher Onizuka 2012.
Hajime Nagamo, the main protagonist in Arifureta : From commonplace to world's strongest.

Other uses
 Hajime Yatate (肇), a pseudonym for the collective contributions of the Sunrise animation staff
 Hajime (malware) A malware which targets the internet of things.

See also
Hajime no Ippo, the Japanese title of the manga series Fighting Spirit

Japanese-language surnames
Japanese masculine given names
Amami surnames